Stafford Township, Indiana may refer to one of the following places:

 Stafford Township, DeKalb County, Indiana
 Stafford Township, Greene County, Indiana

See also

Stafford Township (disambiguation)

Indiana township disambiguation pages